Perfect Match may refer to:

Perfect Match (TV series), a 2023 Netflix original TV series
Perfect Match (American game show), a game show where married couples tried to answer their spouse's questions to win money
Perfect Match (Australian game show)
Perfect Match (British game show)
Perfect Match (1994 game show), a 1994 ESPN game show, with questions based on sports figures
Perfect Match (novel), a 2002 novel by Jodi Picoult
Perfect Match (1989 film), a 1989 Hong Kong film
perfectmatch.com, a dating website
"Perfect Match", a song by Dev from the album The Night the Sun Came Up

The Perfect Match may refer to:
 The Perfect Match (1936 film), a Hong Kong film directed by Tang Xiaodan
 The Perfect Match (1982 film), a Hong Kong film directed by Frankie Chan
 The Perfect Match (1988 film), an American film starring Marc McClure
 The Perfect Match (1991 film), a Hong Kong film directed by Stephen Shin
 The Perfect Match (1995 film), a British film directed by Nick Hurran
 The Perfect Match (2016 film), an American film directed by Bille Woodruff
 The Perfect Match (TV series), a Taiwanese romantic comedy series

A Perfect Match may refer to:
A Perfect Match (1980 film), a 1980 television film starring Colleen Dewhurst and Charles Durning
A Perfect Match (film), a 2007 Belgian film
A Perfect Match (David Houston and Barbara Mandrell album), 1972
A Perfect Match (George Shearing and Ernestine Anderson album), 1988
A Perfect Match (Ella Fitzgerald album), 1979
"A Perfect Match" (song), a 2003 song by the A-Teens from their album New Arrival

See also
Perfect game (disambiguation)